These are some of the notable Single Sign-On (SSO) implementations available:

See also 
 List of OAuth providers
 Identity management
 Identity management systems 
 OpenID 
 SAML 2.0
 SAML-based products and services

Single sign-on
Identity management